Loxioda fasciosa is a moth of the family Noctuidae. It is found in India.

References

Moths described in 1882
Calpinae
Moths of Asia